The River class was a class of six destroyer escorts (originally designated anti-submarine frigates) operated by the Royal Australian Navy (RAN). Plans to acquire four vessels, based on the British Type 12M (or ) frigate, began in the 1950s. The first two vessels had some slight modifications to the design, while the next two underwent further changes. Two more ships were ordered in 1964, following the Melbourne-Voyager collision; these were based on the Type 12I (or ) frigate.

By the 1990s, all six ships had left service. Two were sunk as part of tests, and a third was scuttled as an artificial reef, while the other three ships were scrapped.

Design and construction
In August 1950, the Australian government announced plans to acquire a new class of anti-submarine warfare frigates, based on the British Type 12M (or ) frigate design. Originally six were planned, with construction to be split between Cockatoo Island Dockyard in Sydney and Williamstown Naval Dockyard in Melbourne, but only four were approved.

In 1964, the aircraft carrier  collided with the destroyer , resulting in the destroyer's sinking. Unlike the previous four, the new ships were based on the more advanced Type 12I (or ) design.

The ships had a displacement of 2,150 tons at standard load and 2,700 tons at full load. They were 370 ft. (113m) long, had a beam of 41 ft. (12.5m), and a draught of 13 ft. (3.9 m). Propulsion was provided by two double-reduction geared turbines, which supplied  to two propeller shafts, allowing the vessels to reach . The ship's company consisted of 250 personnel.

Weapons fit for the first four ships at commissioning consisted of two 4.5 inch Mark 6 guns in a single twin turret, two 40 mm Bofors in a twin mount, and two Limbo anti-submarine mortars. During the 1960s, a quadruple Sea Cat anti-aircraft missile launcher was fitted in place of the Bofors, and one of the Limbo mortars was removed in favour of an Ikara missile launcher. Stuart was the first RAN ship fitted with Ikara, and Derwent the first to carry Sea Cat. In the early 1990s, the missile systems were removed from all active Rivers, with an Army RBS 70 unit available for use if required.

Operational history
During their careers, the River-class ships spent most of their time in Australian waters or on multinational exercises, but were regularly deployed to the Far East Strategic Reserve, and saw service during the Indonesia-Malaysia Confrontation.

During 1967 and 1968, Stuart and Yarra were used to escort the troop transport  on voyages to Vietnam.

During the mid-1970s, Yarra underwent a half-life refit, which included the removal of her remaining Limbo, and installation of a Mulloka sonar. Parramatta underwent a more extensive modernisation during the late 1970s, with a new fire control system, modification of the boilers and electrical system, and habitability improvements. Stuart and Derwent underwent similar modernisations between 1979 and 1985. Modernisation was planned for Swan and Torrens during the mid-1980s, but a lack of funding meant that the ships only underwent a half-life refit.

In 1992, reports of sexual harassment aboard Swan prompted investigations by the Australian Defence Force and a Senate committee review.

Decommissioning and fate
Yarra was decommissioned on 22 November 1985. There were plans to keep her in service as a training vessel, but the decision was to keep  active in this role, and Yarra was placed in reserve. The other ships of the class were decommissioned during the 1990s.

Derwent was sunk during explosives testing in 1994. Swan was scuttled as an artificial reef in 1997. Torrens was torpedoed by the Collins-class submarine  during a weapons test in 1999. The other three ships were broken up for scrap.

Specifications
Note: although these ships are grouped together as a single class, there were many significant differences between the first two units, Yarra and Parramatta (Type 12M), the second two units, Stuart and Derwent (modified Type 12M) and the final two units, Swan and Torrens (Type 12I).

: All four of the Type 12M units were refitted with both the Seacat and Ikara missile systems, replacing 40 mm AA guns and Limbo mortars. During refits in the 1980s the Ikara and Seacat systems were removed and 2x Mark 32 triple torpedo launchers were added to all 5 remaining ships (Yarra was scrapped in 1985). Along with this, the 3 newest ships (Derwent, Swan & Torrens) also got mounts for a removable RBS-70 laser guided missile system. (Parramatta and Stuart were due to be decommissioned in 1991, so were not given the RBS-70's as their service life would only be a few more years.)

Ships

Citations

References

External links

Frigate classes